The Heaven Sword and Dragon Saber is a Taiwanese television series adapted from Louis Cha's novel of the same title. The series was first broadcast on TTV in Taiwan in October 1984.

Cast
 Note: Some of the actors listed here played multiple roles.

 Liu Dekai as Zhang Wuji
 Yu Shih-keng as child Zhang Wuji
 Lan Sheng-wen as teenage Zhang Wuji
 Liu Yu-pu as Zhao Min
 Yu Ke-hsin as Zhou Zhiruo
 Tien Li as Xiaozhao
 Liu Te-shu as Yin Li / Ding Minjun
 Hei-niu as child Yin Li
 Yu Yueh-hung / Liu Shang-chian as Zhang Cuishan
 Huang Hsiang-lien as Yin Susu
 Hsieh Chian-wen / Kao I-chieh as Yang Xiao
 Lung Kuan-wu as Fan Yao / Yu Daiyan
 Hsieh Yi-chun as Yang Buhui
 Tsai Tsan-te as child Yang Buhui
 Chan Sing as Xie Xun
 Huang Lung as Wei Yixiao
 Li Chian as Daiqisi
 Wan Shan as Yin Tianzheng / Du Dajin
 Cheng Wen-hao as Yin Yewang
 Ting Wan-chian as Chang Yuchun / Zong Weixia
 Shih Tai-min as Xu Da
 Chiang Han / Chen Chi as Peng Yingyu
 Shih Ting-ken as Shuobude
 Tsui Fu-sheng as Zhou Dian
 Li Chin-kuang as Iron Crowned Taoist
 Yan Chung as Leng Qian
 Wan Chieh as Bai Guishou
 He Wei as Chang Jinpeng
 Yuan Pao-huang as Yuan Guangbo / Situ Qianzhong
 Wang Yu as Hu Qingniu
 Chiang Ching-hsia as Wang Nangu / Yi Sanniang
 Ku Cheng / Kao Sheng as Zhang Sanfeng
 Fan Wei as Song Yuanqiao
 Chang Peng as Yu Lianzhou
 Chiang Ta-chuan as Zhang Songxi
 Tang Chin as Yin Liting
 Tsai Chung-chiu as Mo Shenggu / Du Baidang
 Chang Tai-lun as Song Qingshu
 Peng Chin-wan as Guxuzi
 Tsai Hui-hua as Miejue
 Kuo Li-chin as Ji Xiaofu
 Miao Wei-lan as Bei Jinyi
 Ning Ching-mei as Yi Xiaojun
 Kuan Hung / Chu Pen-ke / Li Chin-kuang as He Taichong
 Cheng Hsiao-wei as Ban Shuxian
 Chang Yuan-ting as Zhan Chun / Wan'er
 Wang Fei as Tang Wenliang
 Hu Wei as Xianyu Tong
 Miao Tien as Ruyang Prince
 Peng Chin-wan as Wang Baobao
 Chan Hsiang as Ah-san
 Li Chiang / Yueh Kai-wu as He Biweng
 Su Kuo-liang as Lu Zhangke
 Hsu I-hua as Lady Han
 Tu Chin-chi as Kongjian / Kongzhi
 Huang Kuan-hsiung / Chiang Ying as Kongwen
 Tseng Shuai-chia as Cheng Kun
 Lü Yun-pao as Du'e
 Chiang Yu as Dunan
 Wu Kun as Escort Chief Shi
 Ma Hsia as Xie Xun's father
 Chao Sha as Xie Xun's mother
 Yi Yuan as Zhu Changling
 Ting Wen as Zhu Changling's wife
 Chen Wen-kui as Zhu Jiuzhen
 Shih Liang-chi as Qiao Fu
 Chen Chi as Wu Qingying
 Yao Chi-hung as Wei Bi
 He Wei as Second Master Yao
 Cheng Ching as Hu Bao
 Chang Ying-chi as Shi Huolong / Liu Ao
 Lü Yao-hua as Chen Youliang
 Yu Hsin-yi as Shi Hongshi
 He Yu-nan and Chen Ching-lung as Qinghai Three Swords
 Li Chin-kuang, Li Yung-wei and Ma Chang as Changbai Three Birds
 Chan Shih-hsian as Su Xizhi
 Mei Chang-fang as Yellow Dress Maiden
 Li Chun-yi as Shou Nanshan
 Liu Chung-yun as Xia Zhou

References

1984 Taiwanese television series debuts
1984 Taiwanese television series endings
Taiwanese wuxia television series
Television shows based on The Heaven Sword and Dragon Saber
Television series set in the Yuan dynasty
Television series about orphans
1980s Taiwanese television series
Television shows about rebels
Television shows set on islands